Michael J. Condon (birth registered second quarter of 1919 – 29 July 1960) was a Welsh rugby union and professional rugby league footballer who played in the 1940s and 1950s, and coached rugby league in the 1950s.

Background
Mike Condon was born in Swansea, Wales, and he died aged 41 in Halifax, England.

Playing career

International honours
Mike Condon won 3 caps for Wales (RL) while at Halifax, he played right-, i.e. number 10, in the 12-20 defeat by France in the 1951–52 European Championship match at Stade Chaban-Delmas, Bordeaux on Sunday 6 April 1952, he played left-, i.e. number 8, in the 8-19 defeat by England in the 1952–53 European Championship match at Central Park, Wigan on Wednesday 17 September 1952, and played left- in the 18-16 victory over Other Nationalities in the 1952–53 European Championship match at Wilderspool Stadium, Warrington on Wednesday 15 April 1953.

Coaching career

Club career
Mike Condon was the coach of Batley from April 1955 to September 1955.

Genealogical information
Mike Condon's marriage to Hilda R. (née Messer) was registered during fourth ¼ 1945 in Swansea district. They had children; Michael F. Condon (birth registered March 30 in West Glamorgan district), and Patricia E. Condon (birth registered during third ¼  in Halifax district).

References

External links
Pastplayers → C-D at swansearfc.co.uk
Statistics at swansearfc.co.uk
Search for "Condon" at espn.co.uk
Player Archive → C at wru.co.uk
Search for "Michael Condon" at britishnewspaperarchive.co.uk
Search for "Mike Condon" at britishnewspaperarchive.co.uk

1919 births
1960 deaths
Batley Bulldogs coaches
Footballers who switched code
Halifax R.L.F.C. players
Rugby league players from Swansea
Rugby league props
Rugby union players from Swansea
Swansea RFC players
Wales national rugby league team players
Welsh rugby league coaches
Welsh rugby league players
Welsh rugby union players